Lazabemide (proposed trade names Pakio, Tempium) is a reversible and selective inhibitor of monoamine oxidase B (MAO-B) that was under development as an antiparkinsonian agent but was never marketed.

References 

Abandoned drugs
Monoamine oxidase inhibitors
Chloroarenes
Pyridines
Carboxamides